Although popes have several times named poets laureate, the practice was never regular and never attained importance. The ceremony to laureate , for example, was little more than a piece of entertainment. The pope could laureate a poet himself or delegate the authority to a papal count palatine or another poet laureate. For example, the papal laureate Johannes Rhagius paid 100 florins for the right to laureate six poets of his choosing. Pope Pius I, who had been laureated by the Emperor Frederick III before ascending the papal throne, never created any poets laureate. Nevertheless, papal poets laureate seem to have been considered of the same rank as the much more prominent imperial poets laureate. In 1512, there was a joint ceremony in which two poets were simultaneously laureated by the pope and an imperial representative.

List of papal poets laureate
Giovanni Aurispa, possibly laureated by Pope Eugene IV or Pope Nicholas V in Rome no later than 1459
Leon Battista Alberti, possibly laureated by Pope Nicholas V no later than 1471
Giovanni Gioviani Pontano, laureated by Pope Innocent VIII on 8 January 1486
Johannes Rhagius, laureated in Rome between 1499 and 1501, possibly by Pope Alexander VI
Francesco Maria Grapaldi, laureated by Pope Julius II in Rome on 11 November 1512
Vincenzo Pimpinelli, laureated by Pope Julius II in Rome on 11 November 1512
, laureated by Pope Leo X in Rome in 1514
Domenico Falugi, laureated by Pope Leo X in Rome on 19 July 1521
Jakob Fischer, laureated no later than 1583, apparently by a pope
Maciej Kazimierz Sarbiewski, laureated by Pope Urban VIII in 1623 after 26 August
Bernardo Perfetti, laureated by Pope Benedict XIII in Rome on 6 or 13 May 1725
Maria Maddalena Morelli Fernandez, laureated by Pope Pius VI in Rome on 31 August 1776

The anonymous "Lombard monk" (monachus Lombardus) whose commentary on Alexander of Villedieu's Doctrinale was published at Milan on 24 March 1484 may have been a papal poet laureate.

In 1577, Bartholomaeus Huber described himself as a "papal and imperial poet laureate", perhaps indicating that the titles were considered interchangeable.

Notes

Bibliography

Poets laureate
Honorary titles of the Holy See